Pérsio Arida (born 1 March 1952 in São Paulo) is a Brazilian economist and a former president of the Central Bank of Brazil.

He has a bachelor's degree in economics from University of São Paulo and a Ph.D in Economics from Massachusetts Institute of Technology.

He has served the Brazilian government by taking part in the crafting of the Plano Real; more specifically, he was one of the creators of the Unidade Real de Valor, a non-monetary currency and the most sophisticated and theoretical piece of the Plano Real. In 1995, he served as the president of the Central Bank of Brazil and Special Secretary of Social-Economic Coordination, Ministry of Planning. In the private sector, he was a board member of Banco Itaú Holding Financeira S.A. and Banco Itaú S.A., board member of Sul-América S.A, director of Opportunity Asset Management Ltda., board member of Unibanco S.A. and special adviser for the presidency and director of Brasil Warrant Ltd. Since the 1970s, he has also worked as an economic and financial consultant.

, he is working as a member of the executive council of the Instituto Moreira Salles.

He is also a member of the International Advisory Board at the Blavatnik School of Government (University of Oxford) and a member of the Academic Board of Livres.

Personally, he is also a fan of classical music.

Selected publications

References 

|-

1952 births
Living people
20th-century Brazilian economists
Presidents of the Central Bank of Brazil
Brazilian classical liberals
21st-century Brazilian economists